The Casa del Prado comprises several reconstructed buildings that were initially built for the Panama–California Exposition in San Diego's Balboa Park, in the U.S. state of California. Current tenants include the San Diego Botanical Garden Foundation, Civic Dance Arts, the San Diego Floral Association, the San Diego Civic Youth Ballet, the San Diego Junior Theatre, and the San Diego Youth Symphony.

References

External links
 

Balboa Park (San Diego)
Buildings and structures in San Diego